The Straight Cliffs Formation is a stratigraphic unit in the Kaiparowits Plateau of south central Utah. It is Late Cretaceous (latest Turonian – early Campanian) in age and contains fluvial (river systems), paralic (swamps and lagoons), and marginal marine (shoreline) siliciclastic strata. It is well exposed around the margin of the Kaiparowits Plateau in the Grand Staircase – Escalante National Monument in south central Utah. The formation is named after the Straight Cliffs, a long band of cliffs creating the topographic feature Fiftymile Mountain.

The Straight Cliffs Formation was deposited in a marginal marine basin system along the western edge of the Cretaceous Western Interior Seaway. It is bounded below by the Tropic Shale and above by the Wahweap Formation. A variety of fossil species have been found within the Straight Cliffs including ammonites, mollusks, foraminifera, ostracods, sharks, fish, amphibians, turtles, lizards, crocodyliforms, dinosaurs, and mammals.

Geology 
The Straight Cliffs Formation overlies the Cenomanian-Turonian Tropic Shale Formation and underlies the Campanian Wahweap Formation. It preserves fluvial and marginal marine strata from the Kaiparowits Basin of the Cretaceous Western Interior Seaway. The formation is primarily composed of sandstone and has lesser amounts of siltstones, mudstones, coals, and conglomerates. It is the partial lateral equivalent of the Mancos Shale formation further east. The Straight Cliffs Formation is latest Turonian to early Campanian in age. The stratigraphy of the formation was initially studied for its coal resources and has more recently been studied as an analog for petroleum reservoirs. Consequently, the stratigraphy of the Straight Cliffs has been analyzed in detail.

Stratigraphy 
The Straight Cliffs Formation was deposited in the Kaiparowits Basin of the Western Interior Seaway. The basin received sediment from the Mogollon highlands, the Sevier fold-thrust and the Cordilleran volcanic arc. The Mogollon highlands were mountains in central Arizona. The Sevier fold-thrust belt was a mountain range forming to the west of the Kaiparowits while the Cordilleran volcanic arc was further west in California.  Although the Straight Cliffs Fm was deposited in an ancient basin it is preserved in a modern physiographic plateau. The Kaiparowits Plateau covers 3,600 km2 and preserves strata located roughly 120 km east of the leading edge of the thrust front at the time of deposition. First analyzed for its coal content, the Straight Cliffs Formation was assessed by Gregory and Moore (1931) and later by Peterson (1969a, 1969b) and Vaninetti (1979). The formation has four members in ascending order, the Tibbet Canyon Member, the Smoky Hollow Member, the John Henry Member and the Drip Tank Member. The lithostratigraphy was first examined by Peterson, who broke the John Henry Member into seven sandstone intervals (A-F) and three coal zones. Shanley and McCabe (1991) outlined sequence boundaries and systems tracts for the plateau based on the facies seen on the southern and eastern sides of the plateau. The formation is thought to represent the final transgression of the Tropic Sea.

Shanley and McCabe (1991) described two major sequence boundaries, which separate the Calico Bed from the underlying shales and the Drip Tank Member from the top of the John Henry Member. In addition they describe two minor sequence boundaries, one within the Tibbet Canyon Member while the other above the A-sandstone within the John Henry Member. Work done by Allen and Johnson (2010a, b, 2011) in the Rogers Canyon area reassessed some of the interpretations made by Shanley and McCabe (1991) and found multiple retrogradationally stacked parasequences creating overall transgressive-regressive cycles.

Tibbet Canyon Member 
The Tibbet Canyon Member consists of shallow- marine, shoreface, and estuarine deposits. It is well exposed in the southwestern and central parts of the Kaiparowits Plateau. The type locality of the Tibbet Canyon Member is near the mouth of Tibbet Canyon. It is about 70–185 ft thick and composed of yellow and gray very fine to medium sandstone. The base of the unit is transitional into the underlying Tropic Shale, and the top of the member is marked by the contact with overlying mudstones and carbonaceous shales of the Smoky Hollow Member. The member is interpreted as beach and shallow marine deposits. As a whole, it is regressive and represents the withdrawal of the Tropic Sea.

Smoky Hollow Member 
The Smoky Hollow Member ranges from coal-bearing coastal plain strata to braided river strata. It is moderately well exposed along the southern margin of the plateau; however, it is often covered along the eastern Straight Cliffs escarpment. The Smoky Hollow is 24 – 331 feet thick and increases in thickness in the northern corner of the plateau. The top of the formation is distinguished by the Calico Bed, a braided fluvial unit, named for its white and orange coloring. The Calico Bed is a useful marker bed as it is present across the Kaiparowits Plateau and is easily distinguished in outcrop. The Smoky Hollow was deposited in non-marine environments, including lagoonal, coastal plain, and fluvial settings.

John Henry Member 
The John Henry Member is the thickest of the four members of the Straight Cliffs. It contains strata that ranges from fluvial to marine. The lithologies seen include gray shales, siltstones, sandstones, carbonaceous shales, occasional coals and shell has beds. It ranges in thickness from 200 – 500 meters. The A – F sandstone intervals have been studied in detail on the eastern margin of the plateau and can be correlated to fluvial units in the southwest and coastal plain coals in the center of the plateau.

Drip Tank Member 
The overlying Drip Tank Member consists of a coarse-grained fluvial facies thought to reflect a braided river environment. The base of the member often creates a bench at the top of the plateau. The upper contact of the Drip Tank grades into the Wahweap Formation creating sloped interval. The Drip Tank is 141 – 523 feet thick and is mainly composed of yellow to brown medium-grained cross stratified sandstone.

Depositional environment 
The Straight Cliffs Formation was deposited in a variety of sub- environments that varied through time as the relative sea level of the Western Interior Seaway changed. The most basal member, the Tibbet Canyon, was deposited on the edge of the Greenhorn Seaway. The Tibbet Canyon preserves the shoreface sands deposited as the shoreline built out into the basin and the seaway retreated. The Smoky Hollow Member preserves fluvial and lagoonal deposits. It was deposited at a time when sea level was relatively low and the shoreline was east of the Kaiparowits Plateau.

The John Henry Member records fluctuations in the sea level. It contains interfingered marine and terrestrial deposits. In the southwestern region of the plateau the John Henry Member preserves ancient river systems which were carrying sediment into the basin from the uplifting Mogollon highlands and Sevier fold – thrust belt. On the eastern side of the Kaiparowits Plateau the John Henry Member preserves interfingered marine and coastal deposits. Careful analysis of the stacking patterns within these beds suggests that the seaway was receding during the bottom third of the John Henry Member. Sea level was rising and flooding the land during the middle portion of John Henry Member deposition. Finally, the sea level fell again during the final phase of deposition.

A sequence boundary separates the Drip Tank Member from the underlying John Henry Member. This means that the strata of the uppermost John Henry Member were subaerially exposed and eroded before Drip Tank deposition. After the period of erosion river systems swept over the Kaiparowits Plateau and deposited the braided fluvial sheet deposits sands of the Drip Tank Member.

Fossil content

Invertebrate paleofauna 
The most diverse and abundant fossils found in the Straight Cliffs Formation are invertebrate fauna. The fauna observed include oysters, ammonites, inoceramids, bivalves, ostracods and foraminifera. Oysters are one of the most common invertebrate fossils found in the Straight Cliffs Formation and are often preserved in large shell hash beds in marginal marine parts of the section. Only the Tibbet Canyon and John Henry members are known to contain marine invertebrate fauna because the Smoky Hollow and Drip Tank Member were deposited in terrestrial settings. The Tibbet Canyon Member was initially dated based a middle Turonian index fossil Inoceramus howelli which indicates the Prionocyclus hyatti ammonite zone.  A variety of invertebrate fossils have been found in the John Henry Member including the ammonite Baculites codyensis and the bivalve Endocostea baltica. Analysis of foraminifera and ostracods has helped refine depositional environment interpretations for a variety of shallow marine sub-environments such as lagoons, bays, and estuaries

Vertebrate paleofauna 
Vertebrate fossils have been found throughout the Straight Cliffs Formation. The fossils from the Straight Cliffs Formation document a diverse assemblage of therian mammals.  The Tibbet Canyon Member contains sharks’ teeth from marine deposits rare mammal fossils from deltaic deposits. Recovered fossils include sharks, rays, lepisosteid fishes, crocodyliforms, and fragmentary marsupial mammal teeth. The Smoky Hollow Member also contains a variety of sharks, amphibians, reptiles, snakes, crocodyliforms, and dinosaurs. The member also contains multituberculate and marsupial mammals. The John Henry Member contains more brackish and marine fauna, as well as mammals and other terrestrial species which are less common.  The Drip Tank Member is primarily fluvial and consequently only water worn fragments of turtle and crocodyliforms have been recovered.

See also 
 List of dinosaur-bearing rock formations
 List of stratigraphic units with few dinosaur genera

References 

Geologic formations of Utah
Upper Cretaceous Series of North America
Cretaceous geology of Utah
Turonian Stage
Coniacian Stage
Santonian Stage
Campanian Stage
Sandstone formations of the United States
Grand Staircase–Escalante National Monument